Chocolate Industries was an American record label. Founded in Miami, Florida by Marvin "Seven" Bedard and cofounder Edgar Farinas the label moved to Chicago, Illinois. The label has released studio albums by the likes of Push Button Objects, Diverse, and Vast Aire. In 1999, it was named by Miami New Times as the Best Electronica Label. In 2004, it was described by Billboard as "one of Chicago's most artful, high-profile indie imprints".

In 2002, Chocolate Industries released the Urban Renewal Program compilation album. In 2012, the label released a compilation album, entitled Personal Space: Electronic Soul 1974-1984.

Roster
 Caural
 The Cool Kids
 Diverse
 East Flatbush Project
 Funkstörung
 Ghislain Poirier
 Ko-Wreck Technique
 Lady Sovereign
 Prefuse 73
 Push Button Objects
 Vast Aire
 Via Tania
 While

References

External links
 
 

American record labels
Companies based in Chicago
Companies based in Miami
Electronic music record labels
Hip hop record labels